Sarbena is a genus of moths in the family Nolidae described by Francis Walker in 1862. They are found across Eastern, Southern, and South East Asia to the Solomon Islands. The caterpillars have white hairs and stack head capsules from past instars.

Species
Known species include:

Sarbena hollowayi László, Ronkay & Witt, 2004 Assam, Thailand, N.Vietnam, Malaysia, Sumatra, Celebes, Seram, Philippines, New Guinea, Solomon Islands
Sarbena inouei László, Ronkay & Witt, 2004 Philippines (Cebu Island, Balabac, Mindoro) 
Sarbena ketipati László, Ronkay & Witt, 2004 Bali
Sarbena lignifera Walker, 1862 Ceylon, Borneo, Sumatra, Bhutan, Vietnam, Thailand, Peninsular Malaysia, Philippines
Sarbena mulaka Fischer, 2020 Maldives
Sarbena sumatrana László, Ronkay & Witt, 2004 Sumatra
Sarbena ustipennis (Hampson, 1895) Bhutan, Ceylon, Thailand, Taiwan, Japan

See also
Uraba lugens

References

Insects described in 1862
Nolinae
Moths of Asia